Fenchurch Street railway station, also known as London Fenchurch Street, is a central London railway terminus in the southeastern corner of the City of London. It takes its name from its proximity to Fenchurch Street, a key thoroughfare in the City. The station and all trains are operated by c2c.

The station opened in 1841 to serve the L&BR and was rebuilt in 1854 when the LTSR, a joint venture between the L&BR and the Eastern Counties Railway (ECR), began operating. In 1862 the Great Eastern Railway was created by amalgamating various East Anglian railway companies (including the ECR) and it shared the station with the LTSR until 1912, when the latter was bought by the Midland Railway. The station came under ownership of the London & North Eastern Railway (LNER) following the Railways Act 1921, and was shared by LNER and London Midland & Scottish Railway (LMS) services until nationalisation in 1948. The line from the station was electrified in 1961, and closed for seven weeks in 1994.

Fenchurch Street is one of the smallest railway terminals in London in terms of platforms, but one of the most intensively operated. It is the only London terminal with no direct interchange with the London Underground.

Location

The station frontage is on Fenchurch Place, adjacent to Fenchurch Street in the City of London. The station has two entrances: one on Fenchurch Place and another on Cooper's Row, near Tower Hill. It has four platforms arranged on two islands elevated on a viaduct. The station has been Grade II listed since 1972 and the conference venue One America Square is built adjacent to it. Following rail privatisation in 1994, the station was run by Network Rail. Since 1996, the station has been served by c2c (which was sold by National Express to Trenitalia in 2017) who have a franchise to run services until 2029.

Fenchurch Street is in the central London Travelcard zone 1 like other terminal stations in the city, but it does not have a direct link to the London Underground.

History

London and Blackwall Railway
 
The area around Fenchurch Street is one of the oldest inhabited parts of London; the name "Fenchurch" derives from the Latin faenum (hay) and refers to hay markets in the area. The station was the first to be granted permission by the Corporation of London to be constructed inside the City of London, following several refusals against other railway companies.

The original building, designed by William Tite opened on 20 July 1841, serving the London and Blackwall Railway (L&BR), replacing a nearby terminus at Minories that had opened in July 1840. It had two platforms connected via a stairway to the booking hall. The reverse journey eastwards required a manual push from railway staff. William Marshall's railway bookstall established at the station in 1841 was the first to be opened in the City of London.

Eastern Counties Railway and London, Tilbury and Southend Railway

Following the opening of the London and Blackwall Extension Railway on 2 April 1849, services operated from Fenchurch Street to Bow & Bromley.

On 26 September 1850, the East and West India Docks and Birmingham Junction Railway (renamed the North London Railway (NLR) on 1 January 1853) started operating a service from  into Fenchurch Street and the L&BR withdrew its service, closing the line between Gas Factory Junction and Bow & Bromley. The station had two heavily used platforms and a double track line from Stepney onwards. To accommodate this service a third line was built between Stepney and Fenchurch Street which was enlarged at this time. The new service commenced on 13 April 1854 using ECR locomotives and stock.

Two platforms were added at the same time as was a circulating area for L&BR and LTSR traffic. The NLR, wanting its own London terminus instead of co-sharing Fenchurch Street, extended its railway towards the new Broad Street station in 1865.

The third track from Stepney to Fenchurch Street opened in 1856, followed by the direct line from Barking in 1858.

Great Eastern Railway

By the 1860s, railways in East Anglia were in financial difficulties, and most lines were leased to the ECR. Although the companies wished to amalgamate they could not obtain government consent until 1862, when the Great Eastern Railway (GER) was formed. In common with most railways, signalling was fairly basic and trains were separated by time interval. As traffic levels increased there was a need to improve signalling and, in 1869, the GER introduced absolute block working between Fenchurch Street, Gas Factory Junction and Bow Junction, opening signal boxes at all locations. In the 1870s the flat awning over the station main's entrance was replaced with the current zig-zag canopy.

The station's track layout was rearranged in 1883 with platform extensions, a fifth platform for use by the Blackwall services and a new gantry signal box (which lasted until the 1935 re-modelling). The GER used the station as an alternative to Liverpool Street station during the late-19th and early-20th centuries for former ECR routes. The GER took over operation of the NLR shuttle from Bow in 1869, which it operated until April 1892 when the second Bow Road railway station opened along with a passenger foot connection to the NLR station. Subsequent services into Fenchurch Street were operated by the GER and the LTSR, and three years later the viaduct from Stepney to Fenchurch Street was widened to accommodate a fourth track.

Despite this, overcrowding of LTSR services was still occurring and this persisted until 1902 when the opening of the Whitechapel and Bow Railway offered an alternative route.

In 1912, the Midland Railway (MR) bought and took over operation of the LTSR services.

London, Midland and Scottish Railway
After the Railways Act 1921 the country's railways were grouped into four companies, with effect from 1 January 1923. At Fenchurch Street, the London, Midland and Scottish Railway (LMSR) took over operations of the MR, whilst GER services were taken over by the London and North Eastern Railway (LNER). The Blackwall and North Greenwich passenger services were scheduled for closure on 30 June 1926 but the general strike brought that forward to 3 May.

The station was rebuilt in 1935 to address overcrowding and provide better accommodation for Southend line services. When the former ECR lines transferred to the Underground's Central line in 1948, the station was served solely by the former LTSR services.

Nationalisation and beyond

Following nationalisation of Britain's railways in 1948, the station transferred under British Railways to the Eastern Region although the old LTSR network west of Gasworks Junction was controlled by the London Midland Region. On 20 February 1949, the whole LTS line was transferred to the Eastern Region, yet despite the organisational changes, the old LTSR still was a distinctive system operated by former LTS and LMS locomotives until electrification.

British Railways electrified the former LTSR line in 1959. Electric services began on 6 November 1961 and a full electric timetable was introduced on 18 June the following year. In the 1980s, the station roof was dismantled and high-rise office blocks were built above the station leaving the 1854 facade intact.

Fenchurch Street station suffered a negative reputation under public ownership. By the end of the 1980s, the former LTSR line was carrying over 50,000 passengers a day on a 50-year old infrastructure. The persistent overcrowding and uncleanliness on trains led to it being dubbed "the misery line". In 1989 Sir Robert Reid called the service from Fenchurch Street "wholly unacceptable", while Teresa Gorman, Member of Parliament for Billericay, subsequently called it "one of the disgraces of our public railway service for many years". Between 1982 and 1992, the station was operated by Network SouthEast, one of British Rail's three passenger business sectors, before being handed over to a business unit in preparation for privatisation.

In July 1994, shortly before rail privatisation, the station closed for seven weeks for an £83 million project to replace signals, track and electrification works. It was the first significant closure of a London terminal station, albeit planned and temporary.

The development of Lakeside Shopping Centre, near Chafford Hundred and Thurrock, increased demand for services from the station. In 2013, Network Rail announced a £3.4m upgrade creating a third exit on Cooper's Row to make connections with Tower Hill easier.

In 2019, a planning application  was submitted to the City of London (planning authority) for permission to revamp the station building.

Underground
In the 1970s, Fenchurch Street was considered to be an integral part of the proposed Fleet line (now called the Jubilee line), which would have given the station an Underground connection. A revised route, approved in 1980, would have seen the line follow a more northerly route to Woolwich Arsenal and Beckton.

Mott, Hay and Anderson and Sir William Halcrow and Partners began constructing the line to Charing Cross, but did not finish the project until 1979. Rising costs and high inflation led to London Transport abandoning the eastwards extension via Fenchurch Street in 1981. This has altered demand for Fenchurch Street, with passengers from Essex changing there instead.

Services

The typical off-peak service consists of eight trains per hour (tph):

During peak periods services are increased up to 20 trains per hour. Most peak services have 12 cars.

Although the station's capacity is small compared to other London terminals, it has a high footfall, averaging around 16 million passengers annually. A report in 2001 showed approximately 3,000 people commuted daily from Castle Point to the city via Fenchurch Street, while a 2013 report said it was the busiest station on the LTSR route, with 46,000 daily peak-time passengers.

Future 
There have been proposals to move the station 380 yards to the east to allow the station to expand to 6 platforms, (up from the current 4) and would be built partly on the site of Tower Gateway DLR station, which would likely be permanently closed.

The new station could be built with direct interchange with Tower Hill tube station, which could also have a replacement DLR station for Tower Gateway as Transport for London have looked into closing Tower Gateway and constructing a replacement on the Bank branch to increase capacity.

Incidents
On 1 August 1859, two trains collided head-on at low speed when an arriving North Woolwich service passed a signal at danger and struck a stationary Tilbury Riverside service. No-one was injured.
On 28 November 1860, a track defect caused the first four carriages of a departing train to Benfleet to derail at low speed. No-one was injured.
On 24 June 1872, a service arriving from  collided with the buffer stops at the platform end, resulting in injury to three passengers.
On 17 August 1872, two people were injured when their train collided with an empty train being shunted out of a siding.
On 4 May 1893 a bricklayer, described at the time as "deaf and dumb", who was working on lineside alterations on the Blackwall line, near the station, was stuck by a train as he crossed the line, after not hearing shouted warnings. He later died from his injuries.
On 9 March 1908, a point cleaner working near the station was injured. A Board of Trade enquiry criticised the lack of look-outs for railway workers.
An estimated 860 passengers were aboard at the time. Driver error and excessive speed were blamed.
On 26 January 1927, 10 people were injured on a train to Westcliff in a head-on collision and subsequent derailment caused by defects in the signal detection and signals.

Goods depots

A number of goods depots were established near Fenchurch Street owing to the station's proximity to the City of London. This table lists the depots connected to the line between the station and Christian Street Junction just east of :

Cultural references
The poet John Betjeman passed through the station on day-trips to Southend, and described it as a "delightful hidden old terminus".

Fenchurch Street is one of four railway stations on the standard UK Monopoly board, alongside Liverpool Street, Marylebone and King's Cross. All are former LNER terminal stations.

The 2005 football hooliganism film Green Street used the station to represent Manchester Piccadilly.

In the Douglas Adams novel So Long, and Thanks for All the Fish, Fenchurch was so-named because she was conceived at the station.

References
Notes

Citations

Sources

External links

Fenchurch Street Station – Transport for London journey planner

Railway termini in London
Railway stations in the City of London
Railway stations in Great Britain opened in 1841
Railway stations served by c2c
Former London and Blackwall Railway stations
William Tite railway stations
1841 establishments in England
London station group